Chicago jazz may refer to:

 Chicago Jazz (synchronized skating team), a junior-level synchronized skating team
 Chicago jazz, Chicago-style Dixieland jazz

See also
Chicago Jazz Festival
Music of Chicago